The rules of the garage are a set of eleven rules that attempt to encapsulate the work ethos that Bill Hewlett and David Packard when they founded Hewlett-Packard. Since Hewlett-Packard was one of the earliest success stories of the information technology sector, it also used to more broadly describe the work ethos of Silicon Valley.

Etymology 
The Rules were first articulated in 1999 by then HP CEO Carly Fiorina - during her tenure as then HP CEO - and they were later used in a Hewlett-Packard ad campaign. The name was a reference to David Packard's garage in Palo Alto, in which Packard and Bill Hewlett first founded the company after graduating from nearby Stanford University in 1935.

The Eleven "Rules of the Garage" 
The eleven rules are:
 Believe you can change the world.
 Work quickly, keep the tools unlocked, work whenever.
 Know when to work alone and when to work together.
 Share — tools, ideas. Trust your colleagues.
 No Politics. No bureaucracy. (These are ridiculous in a garage.)
 The customer defines a job well done.
 Radical ideas are not bad ideas.
 Invent different ways of working.
 Make a contribution every day. If it doesn’t contribute, it doesn’t leave the garage.
 Believe that together we can do anything.
 Invent.

See also Wikipedia discussion of HP culture

References 

Hewlett-Packard
Business ethics
Mottos
American advertising slogans
1999 neologisms
Rules